Żerczyce  (Zhyrchytsi) is a village in the administrative district of Gmina Nurzec-Stacja, within Siemiatycze County, Podlaskie Voivodeship, in north-eastern Poland, close to the border with Belarus.

According to the 1921 census, the village was inhabited by 271 people, among whom 19 were Roman Catholic, 248 Orthodox, and 4 Mosaic. At the same time, 27 inhabitants declared Polish nationality, 240 Belarusian and 4 Jewish. There were 51 residential buildings in the village.

References

Villages in Siemiatycze County